Monkey Business is a UK TV series that premiered in 1998, focusing on the various primates living at Monkey World, a rescue centre and sanctuary for primates in Dorset, United Kingdom. The series featured Jim Cronin and Alison Cronin, directors of Monkey World, as they travelled around the world rescuing primates often from abusive situations, and bringing them to the Monkey World sanctuary. The goal of Monkey World was the rehabilitation of the rescued primates, who were then released to live within the sanctuary in as natural-a-habitat as possible. The series was narrated by Chris Serle.

Monkey World 
Jim Cronin MBE was born and raised in the US and when he moved to England worked at various animal parks/zoos before co-founding Monkey World with long-time friend Jeremy Keeling in 1987. The pair leased an old pig farm and converted it into the sanctuary which now covers 65 acres.

Jim's wife, Dr Alison Cronin, worked alongside Jim and is responsible for the day-to-running of the sanctuary, still nursing and feeding the animals herself. The position of Animal Director is held by Jeremy Keeling, who is also a hands-on member of staff.

Production
Monkey Business was produced by Meridian Broadcasting and ran for nine seasons on both ITV Meridian and Animal Planet. Those episodes also appeared the National Geographic Channel. After ten years of Monkey Business production, first by Tigress then Meridian ITV and finally by Athena Films on behalf of Meridian and Animal Planet Productions, Monkey Business ended its run with a three-part series called 10 Years of Monkey Business.

Monkey Life 
Monkey Life, a follow-on series based on the work of Monkey World, was created in 2006 by Primate Planet Productions Ltd and was initially produced and directed by Athena Films before being taken-on wholly and produced in-house by Primate Planet Productions in 2008. Initially shown on Five and later on Pick in the UK, and on Animal Planet and other TV channels worldwide, Monkey Life has now completed thirteen seasons. The first season was narrated by Andy Serkis, famous for voicing Gollum in The Lord of the Rings movies. Seasons two through thirteen have been narrated by British actor Ralf Little.

Animals

Chimpanzees
The chimpanzees are divided in four groups.

Paddy's Group were the first chimpanzee group to form at Monkey World when it opened in 1987. The leader Paddy died in 2016 and was succeeded by his son Bart.

The Bachelor Boys, an all-male group which formed in 1996 to take in male chimpanzees that did not fit into mixed sex groups. One of its most famous residents was named Charlie, rescued by Cronin from a beach photographer in Spain who was using the chimpanzee as a prop.

Hananya's Group was formed in 1998 and was originally led by Charlie before his move to the Bachelor Boys. He was succeeded in 1999 by Rodney, who led the group until his death in 2004 and was succeeded by his second-in-command Hananya.

The internal politics within these groups determine how long each male is leader.

The Nursery Group led by Sally and Lulu took in chimpanzees that arrived at the park at a young age or were born at the park who had been rejected by their mothers and would care for them until they were old enough to join one of the adult groups. Sally died in 2018 and was succeeded by Bryan, one of her wards.

Orangutans
Originally the only orangutans at the park were Amy (who had been at the park since it opened in 1987) and her mate Banghi (who arrived in 1988 from Chester Zoo). Their son Gordon was born in 1997. Banghi died in 1998. Amy and Gordon were later joined by other female orangutans named RoRo, Lucky, Hsiao-Quai and Hsiao-Lan and an adult male named Tuan, who served as leader of the group. In later years, the group split into two; one led by Gordon and another led by Tuan.

In 2005, an Orangutan nursery was formed to take in young orangutans born at Monkey World or European zoos that were orphaned or rejected by their mothers. The foster mother of the group was A-Mei until her move to Tuan's Group in 2015 and is now led by Oshine, who arrived at the park in 2010.

Other primates

The other 14 species include woolly monkeys, capuchins, squirrel monkeys, marmosets, cotton-top tamarins, siamang gibbons, golden-cheeked gibbons and other gibbons.

Monkey World is part of the international species breeding program for golden-cheeked gibbons, orangutans and woolly monkeys.

External links
Monkey World official site
watch Monkey Business on Discovery Broadband
Monkey Business page on Animal Planet UK

1998 British television series debuts
Animal Planet original programming
ITV (TV network) original programming
Television series by ITV Studios
Television shows produced by Meridian Broadcasting
English-language television shows
Television series about monkeys
Television shows set in Dorset